Churche's Mansion is a timber-framed, black-and-white Elizabethan mansion house at the eastern end of Hospital Street in Nantwich, Cheshire, England. The Grade I listed building dates from 1577, and is one of the very few to have survived the Great Fire of Nantwich in 1583.

Built for Richard Churche, a wealthy Nantwich merchant, and his wife, it remained in their family until the 20th century. In 1930, it was rescued from being shipped to the US by Edgar Myott and his wife, who began restoration work. As well as a dwelling, the mansion has been used as a school, restaurant, shop, and granary and hay store.

The building has four gables to the front; the upper storey and the attics all overhang with jetties. The upper storeys feature decorative panels, and the exterior has many gilded carvings. The principal rooms have oak panelling, some of which is Elizabethan in date. The architectural historian Nikolaus Pevsner considered Churche's Mansion to be among the best timber-framed Elizabethan buildings in Cheshire, describing it as "an outstanding piece of decorated half-timber architecture."

History 

Churche's Mansion was built for Richard Churche and his wife Margerye by Thomas Clease in 1577. A panel under a window to the right of the main entrance bears the inscription:

The only other remaining work signed by craftsman Thomas Clease (also Cleese) is the Queen's Aid House on Nantwich High Street, known for its inscription thanking Elizabeth I for her aid in the town's rebuilding after the Great Fire.

The land in "Hospitull Strete" on which the mansion was built had been granted to John and Nicolas Churchehouse of Grayste (Gresty) in 1474–5 by John Marchomley and his son John, Richard and William Cholmondeley, and John Bromley. By the late 16th century, the Churche family (known variously as Church, Chirche, Kyrke and Churchehouse) was a prominent one in Nantwich. Richard Churche was a wealthy local merchant who, at his death in 1592, owned "one wiche-house of six leads in Wich Malbank", as well as considerable land holdings both locally and in Shropshire and Stafford. His wife, Margerye or Margaret Churche, daughter of Roger Wright, came from another significant Nantwich family; she survived her husband, living until 1599.

Standing on the edge of the old town, the recently completed Churche's Mansion survived the fire of 1583 which destroyed almost all of Nantwich east of the River Weaver. The only other buildings known to have survived were Sweetbriar Hall, also on Hospital Street, and the parish church. Richard Churche willed "the house ... wherein I now dwell on the Ospell Street" to his second son, Rondull, Randol or Randle Church(e). The house is mentioned among the principal houses of the town in a 1622–3 account by William Webb, who describes the mansion as "a fair timber-house of Mr. Randol Church, a gentleman of singular integrity." Randle Church survived until 1648, outliving his son and grandson, and Churche's Mansion then passed to the Shropshire branch of the family, descended from Richard Churche's eldest son, William. The Churche family inhabited the house until at least 1691, when a rate book records Saboth Church as the resident and gives the rates as 2 shillings 8½ pence.

Although Saboth Church (also Sabbath or Sabboth) was the last Churche family member to live in the mansion (he died in 1717), it remained in the family's possession until the 20th century, with a succession of tenants. In the early 19th century, the mansion was tenanted by a tanner and later by an attorney-at-law. In 1858–68, it was untenanted, and was used as a granary and hay store by a local cowkeeper. From 1869 until at least 1883, it housed the ladies' boarding and day school of Mrs E.H. Rhodes. The mansion later fell into disrepair, and in 1930, it was saved from dismantling to ship to the US by local resident Edgar Myott and his wife, who purchased the building and began restoration work. It was listed at grade I on 19 April 1948. During much of the 20th century it was used as a restaurant, and it has been an antiques shop since 2001. In 2007 the mansion was featured on Most Haunted: Midsummer Murders.

Architecture 

The mansion house has four gables to the front and a two-gabled wing to the left-hand side; its plan resembles the nearby Dorfold Hall. The roof is tiled, with two prominent brick chimney stacks. There are two storeys with an attic, with both the first and second floors overhanging the floor beneath to form jetties, a typical feature of timber-framed town houses of this date. The protruding floor joists are concealed by plaster coving built up over shaped brackets and laths, in a fashion described by Pevsner as a "speciality of Cheshire".

The upper storeys have ornamental panels featuring several different decorative motifs, including roundels and diagonal ogee braces. The eaves have corbel brackets with carvings including human faces and animals. These include a lion, ape and devil, as well as a salamander, supposed to give protection against fire. Gilded carvings of Richard and Margerye Churche are located above the main entrance, on either side. The timbers bear carpenters' marks with both Roman and Arabic numerals, some being unusually long. The highly decorated style is typical of the timber-framed buildings of the Elizabethan period.

The windows are predominantly mullioned and transomed, with three to five lights including some stained glass panels. Only the window above the porch is possibly original; some casements date from the 18th century, and several are 20th-century replacements. Two windows have inscriptions beneath them: one inscription gives the date of construction and is quoted previously; the other states "The roote of Wysedom is to Feare God, & the branch thereof shall too endure."

Interior features 
The house is laid out around a large central hall connecting the mansion's two gabled end-pieces, which was used for dining. The other major rooms on the ground floor are the withdrawing room to the right of the hall, and the buttery and kitchen to the left; there is also a small entrance porch at the main Hospital Street entrance. The first floor has five main rooms: the upper hall (never open to the roof) and four solars (private upper rooms, some of which would have contained beds), as well as a small chapel. The attic is divided into five rooms and provided servants' accommodation.

The entrance porch has a panelled ceiling with inlaid decoration and a moulded doorcase with an 18th-century oak door. The hall has a spiral staircase between storeys; it also contains an original cupboard bearing the Churche's initials and crest, and the inscription "Blessed art thou that feares and walkest in His wayes for thou shalte eate and happie arte." The first floor hall features a coffin drop, a hole in the floor allowing the lowering of large items that would otherwise be difficult to manipulate on the narrow spiral staircase. Traditionally used for coffins, the coffin drop would also facilitate the movement of large pieces of furniture. Several rooms have large open fireplaces, with a brick inglenook fireplace in the kitchen. An Elizabethan well was discovered during renovation work.

The principal rooms on both ground and first floors feature oak panelling; that in one of the upper rear rooms is Elizabethan. This room also features a fine carved overmantel with a woven love knot and central heart; the ground floor room to the right of the hall contains a further good example of a carved overmantel. One of the rooms has panels decorated with intersecting triangles.

Grounds and outbuildings 
Churche's Mansion was constructed on the edge of Nantwich, and in the 16th century would presumably have been surrounded by farmland. The building was originally moated, and traces of the moat remained in the late 19th century. The transfer deed of 1474–5 mentions that the plot had gardens and orchards, while Richard Churche's will of 1592 describes the property as having "gardens meadowe dovehouse stable & buyldings" and an orchard is also mentioned in the 1691 rate book. The rear garden formerly featured a sunken pond.

The house has a small formal garden facing Hospital Street, and a walled garden at the rear with lawns, fruit trees and an oak.

See also 

 Grade I listed buildings in Cheshire
 Listed buildings in Nantwich
 46 High Street, Nantwich

Notes and references 

Sources
 Bilsborough, N. The Treasures of Cheshire (Environmental Institute; 1983)
 Dore, R. N. Cheshire (BT Batsford; 1977)
 Hall, J. A History of the Town and Parish of Nantwich, or Wich Malbank, in the County Palatine of Chester (2nd edn) (E. J. Morten; 1972)
 Harris, R. Discovering Timber-framed Buildings (Shire Publications, Princes Risborough; 2003)
 McKenna, L. Timber Framed Buildings in Cheshire (Cheshire County Council; 1994)
 Pevsner, N., Hubbard, E. The Buildings of England: Cheshire (Penguin Books; 1971)

Further reading 
 Myott, E. C. (1951) "The Homes of Cheshire. 20: Churche's Mansion, Nantwich" Cheshire Life Feb p. 21 (part 1), Mar p. 18–19 (part 2), Apr p. 18–19 (part 3)

External links
 Churche's Mansion website: includes photographs and plans

Houses completed in 1577
Grade I listed buildings in Cheshire
Grade I listed houses
Houses in Nantwich
Timber framed buildings in Cheshire